{{DISPLAYTITLE:C21H31NO2}}
The molecular formula C21H31NO2 may refer to:

 Androisoxazole
 Bornaprine
 EIDD-036 (progesterone 20-oxime)
 Golexanolone
 4-HTMPIPO
 Prolame

Molecular formulas